Muhammad Suhail Zubairy, HI, SI, FPAS (born 19 October 1952), is a University Distinguished Professor as of 2014 in the Department of Physics and Astronomy at the Texas A&M University and is the inaugural holder of the Munnerlyn-Heep Chair in Quantum Optics.

In 2017, Prof. Suhail Zubairy was awarded the Changjiang Distinguished Chair at Huazhong University of Science and Technology. This is the highest award of the Chinese Government to a university professor and is rarely given to a non-Chinese. He has made pioneering contributions in the fields of Quantum computing, laser physics and quantum optics. He has authored and co-authored several books and over 300 research papers on a wide variety of research problems relating to theoretical physics. His research and work has been widely recognised by the physics community and he has won many international awards. In addition, he took part as the lead lecturer in the Casper College Quantum Science Camp during July 2022.

Academic career
Zubairy attended Edwardes College in Peshawar, where he received double BSc degree in physics and mathematics from the Peshawar University, in 1971. He was conferred with Gold Medal with his degree by Peshawar University. He received MSc in physics from the Quaid-i-Azam University in 1974, and his PhD in physics from the University of Rochester under the guidance of Professor Emil Wolf in 1978. He wrote an internationally renowned textbook on Quantum Optics that he co-authored with Marlan O. Scully.

His research interests are very wide and he has written papers on quantum optical applications to quantum computing, quantum informatics, quantum entanglement and sub-wavelength atom localisation. More recently, Zubairy has concentrated most of his efforts on research in quantum microscopy and quantum lithography, some of which are ground breaking. For example, his papers on sub-wavelength lithography using classical light sources are very well received. His recent Physical Review Letters was reviewed in Physical Review Focus as well as in the News of the Week section of Nature. Another of his recent Physical Review Letters was selected by Science as a news release with the title "A new way to beat the limit on shrinking transistors".

Awards and honours
 Changjiang Distinguished Chair Professor, HUST, China (2017)
 Willis E. Lamb Award for Laser Science and Quantum Optics (2014)
 Bush Excellence Award for International Research (2011)
 Humboldt Senior Scientist Research Award (2007)
 Khwarizmi International Award by the President of Iran (2001)
 Hilal-e-Imtiaz (Crescent of Excellence) Award by the Government of Pakistan (2000)
 COMSTECH Award for Physics (1999)
 Sitara-i-Imtiaz (Star of Excellence) Award by the Government of Pakistan (1993)
 Gold Medal, Pakistan Academy of Sciences (1989)
 Abdus Salam Prize for Physics (1986)

Fellowships
 Fellow American Physical Society (2006)
 Fellow Pakistan Academy of Sciences (1995)
 Fellow Optical Society of America (1988)

References

Recipients of Hilal-i-Imtiaz
Recipients of Sitara-i-Imtiaz
University of Rochester alumni
Texas A&M University faculty
Pakistani physicists
Academic staff of Quaid-i-Azam University
Quaid-i-Azam University alumni
1952 births
Living people
Fellows of Pakistan Academy of Sciences
Theoretical physicists
Pakistani information theorists
University of Peshawar alumni
Supercomputing in Pakistan
American academics of Pakistani descent
Edwardes College alumni
Pakistani emigrants to the United States
Fellows of the American Physical Society